Jalometalli Metal Music Festival is a Finnish heavy metal festival held annually in Oulu since 2002. The festival mainly features old school thrash metal and death and black metal bands.

Lineups

2002
Thyrane
Monsterspank
Funeris Nocturnum
Maple Cross

2003
Sicknote
Thyrane
Sethery
Embraze
Wounds
Wengele

2004
Held on 20 and 21 August at Kuusisaari in Oulu.

20 August
Diamanthian
Thyrane
Neolith
For My Pain...
Kalmah
Sethery
Fore
The Howl, Downfade
21 August
The Duskfall
Devilyn
Pain Confessor
Maple Cross
Lambs
Sacred Crucifix
Final Dawn
Crematory
Dark Flood
Letheria
Wengele
Mors Subita

2005
Held on 19 and 20 August at Kuusisaari in Oulu. A closing party was held on 20 August at Hevimesta in Oulu.

19 August
Dissection
Exmortem
Atakhama
Deathbound
For My Pain...
Machine Men
Sicknote
Swallow the Sun
Wrathage

20 August
Entombed
Sotajumala
Brussel Kaupallinen
De Lirium's Order
Deathchain
Embraze
Lambs
Malicious Death
National Napalm Syndicate
Omnium Gatherum
Reflexion

Closing party
Wasara
Amplifire

2006
Held on 18 and 19 August at Club Teatria in Oulu.

18 August
Helloween (GER)
Dismember (SWE)
The Duskfall (SWE/FIN)
Tarot
Kalmah
Rotten Sound
Manitou
Ajattara
Fall of the Idols
Ghost Machinery

19 August
U.D.O. (GER)
Onslaught (GBR)
Reverend Bizarre
Swallow the Sun
Thunderstone
Moonsorrow
Enochian Crescent
Embraze
Before the Dawn
Rytmihäiriö
Hellbox
The Scourger
Slugathor

2007
Held on 17 and 18 August at Club Teatria in Oulu.
Friday 17 August
Testament (USA)
Rotting Christ (GR)
Unleashed (SWE)
Eternal Tears of Sorrow
Deathchain
Amoral
Horna
Omnium Gatherum
National Napalm Syndicate
Perfect Chaos

Saturday 18 August
Kreator (GER)
Candlemass (SWE)
Holy Moses (GER)
Insomnium
Machine Men
Twilightning
Kiuas
Domination Black
Burning Point
Altaria
Sacred Crucifix
Profane Omen

2008 
Friday 15 August
Masterstroke
Adastra
Prestige
Pantheon I (NOR)
Sadistic Intent (USA)
Mortal Sin (AUS)
Possessed (USA)
Blitzkrieg (GBR)
Overkill (USA)
Turisas

Saturday 16 August
Fall of the Idols
Heavy Metal Perse
Catamenia
Kalmah
Desaster (GER)
Evocation (SWE)
Barathrum
Sotajumala
Astral Doors (SWE)
Mayhem (NOR)
Trouble (USA)
Satyricon (NOR)
KYPCK

2009
Friday 14 August
Deathchain
Burning Point
Solstafir
Stormwarrior
Hail of Bullets
Rage
Voivod

Saturday 15 August
Gnostic
Torture Killer
Artillery
Nifelheim
Paradox
Asphyx
Whiplash
Atheist
Agent Steel
Death Angel

References

External links

Official website

Music festivals in Finland
Heavy metal festivals in Finland
Culture in Oulu
Music festivals established in 2002
Tourist attractions in Oulu
2002 establishments in Finland